Zlatko Tanevski (born 3 August 1983) is a Macedonian retired football defender who finished his career at FK Vardar.

Club career
Tanevski was born in Skopje.  He joined Lech Poznań from Vardar Skopje in February 2007. Tanevski also played for Cementarnica Skopje.  Tanevski's contract with Lech Poznań expired in the summer of 2010 and he signed with Polish team GKS Bełchatów on 17 June 2010. In January 2012 he joined the biggest Macedonian club FK Vardar.

International career
Tanevski made his debut for the Macedonian national team on 22 December 2010 in a friendly away to China, it remained his only international appearance.

Achievements
Lech Poznań
Polish League: 1
Winner: 2010
Polish Cup: 1
Winner: 2009
Polish SuperCup: 1
Winner: 2009
FK Vardar
Macedonian First Football League: 2
Winner: 2011–12, 2012–13
Macedonian Football Supercup: 1
Winner: 2013

References

External links
 Profile at MacedonianFootball 
 

1983 births
Living people
Footballers from Skopje
Association football central defenders
Macedonian footballers
North Macedonia international footballers
FK Cementarnica 55 players
FK Vardar players
Lech Poznań players
GKS Bełchatów players
Macedonian First Football League players
Ekstraklasa players
Macedonian expatriate footballers
Expatriate footballers in Poland
Macedonian expatriate sportspeople in Poland